Mohammad Farooq (born 8 April 1938) is a former Pakistani international cricketer who played in seven Test matches between 1960 and 1965.

Cricket career
Mohammad Farooq was one of Pakistan's fastest bowlers in the 1960s, but his career was short. He made his name in 1959-60, his first season of first-class cricket. In his third first-class match, he took 6 wickets for the cost of 87 runs (6/87) and 5/98 to bowl Karachi to victory in the final of the Quaid-e-Azam Trophy. He was selected to tour India with the Pakistan team in 1960/61 and played in the first Test, taking the first three Indian wickets and finishing with 4/139 from 46 overs. Pakistan, however, replaced him with a batsman for the second Test, and he did not return to the team until the fifth Test, when he took two wickets.

He toured England in 1962. He was successful in the early county matches and took 4/70 when included in the team for the second Test at Lord's, including the wickets of Ted Dexter and Ken Barrington, both caught behind off successive balls. He was, however, being asked to do too much bowling and succumbed to injury after the third Test and took no further part in the tour.

He played no first-class cricket for more than two years, but returned in the 1964/65 season. After showing good form in domestic cricket he returned to the Test team against the touring New Zealanders. He was the most successful bowler on either side in the three-Test series, taking 10 wickets at an average of 25.30 runs per wicket. In the first Test, at Rawalpindi, he took 2/57 and 3/25, and going to the crease when Pakistan were 253 for 9, he scored 47 runs, his highest first-class score, in a tenth-wicket partnership of 65 in 54 minutes with Salahuddin. After the third Test of the series, which Pakistan won 2–0, he played no further first-class cricket.

References

External links

1938 births
Living people
Pakistan Test cricketers
Pakistani cricketers
Karachi cricketers
Karachi Blues cricketers
Pakistan Eaglets cricketers
People from Junagadh